John Frederick Leach (6 March 1878 – 14 April 1908) was an Australian rules footballer who played for the Collingwood Football Club in the Victorian Football League (VFL).

Family
The son of Thomas Leach (1847-1916), and Emma Bunkin Leach (1847-1893), née Stuckey, John Frederick Leach was born in Heidelberg, Victoria on 6 March 1878.

Brothers
His two brothers, Arthur Thomas Leach (1876–1948) and Edward Hale "Ted" Leach (1883-1965) also played for Collingwood.

Football
Leach was a centreman in the losing Grand Final side of 1901, but played at centre half-back in the 1902 premiership team.

At the end of the 1899 season, in the process of naming his own "champion player", the football correspondent for The Argus ("Old Boy"), selected a team of the best players of the 1899 VFL competition:Backs: Maurie Collins (Essendon), Bill Proudfoot (Collingwood), Peter Burns (Geelong); Halfbacks: Pat Hickey (Fitzroy), George Davidson (South Melbourne), Alf Wood (Melbourne); Centres: Fred Leach (Collingwood), Firth McCallum (Geelong), Harry Wright (Essendon); Wings: Charlie Pannam (Collingwood), Eddie Drohan (Fitzroy), Herb Howson (South Melbourne); Forwards: Bill Jackson (Essendon), Eddy James (Geelong), Charlie Colgan (South Melbourne); Ruck: Mick Pleass (South Melbourne), Frank Hailwood (Collingwood), Joe McShane (Geelong); Rovers: Dick Condon (Collingwood), Bill McSpeerin (Fitzroy), Teddy Rankin (Geelong).From those he considered to be the three best players — that is, Condon, Hickey, and Pleass — he selected Pat Hickey as his "champion player" of the season. ('Old Boy', "Football: A Review of the Season", (Monday, 18 September 1899), p.6).

Death
He died of typhoid fever at his father's residence in Surrey Hills on 14 April 1908.

Footnotes

References
Holmesby, Russell and Main, Jim (2007). The Encyclopedia of AFL Footballers. 7th ed. Melbourne: Bas Publishing.

External links

 
 

1878 births
1908 deaths
Collingwood Football Club players
Collingwood Football Club Premiership players
Australian rules footballers from Melbourne
Deaths from typhoid fever
One-time VFL/AFL Premiership players
People from Heidelberg, Victoria